Mir Najm Zargar Gilani, also known as Shaykh Najm al-Din Zargar Rashti, was an Iranian aristocrat of Gilaki origin, who was the second person to serve as the vakil (vicegerent) of the Safavid Empire.

A native of Gilan in northern Iran, Najm Zargar was originally a goldsmith in Rasht, but due to his Iranian descent was in 1507 appointed as vakil by the Safavid king Ismail I. However, Najm Zargar's tenure as vakil did not last long, since he later died in 1509/10, and was succeeded by Najm-e Sani.

References

Sources 
 
 
 
 

1500s deaths
15th-century births
People from Gilan Province
Vakils of Safavid Iran
Commanders-in-chief of Safavid Iran
16th-century people of Safavid Iran